Lloyd J. Williams (born 7 May 1940) is an Australian property developer and businessperson, with significant interests in thoroughbred horse racing. He holds the record as a thoroughbred owner to have won the Melbourne Cup on the most occasions, his most recent in 2020 with Twilight Payment.

Biography
Williams was educated at Xavier College, Melbourne.

He is the founder of Crown Casino and Entertainment Complex, established in 1994, located in Melbourne, Victoria. Crown is Australia's largest casino and one of the largest single casinos in the world. In 1999, Williams sold the majority of his interests to Publishing and Broadcasting Limited and other entities associated with the Packer family.

With David Gonski, Williams was the co-executor of the estate of the late Kerry Packer. Jackson Lloyd Packer, the son and male heir of James Packer, was given his middle name out of respect to Williams.

Williams' family controlled business is called Hudson Conway, that has investments in a wide range of properties across Melbourne, now managed by his son, Nick.

Thoroughbred horse racing
Williams is one of Australia's largest thoroughbred racehorse owners and owns a  stable outside Melbourne. With his wife, Suzie, Williams has won Australia's most prestigious race, the Melbourne Cup, on seven occasions; in 1981, 1985, 2007, 2012, 2016, 2017 and 2020.

In 2000, he and Kerry Packer bought Enzeli from Aga Khan for about £200,000 to race in the Cup.

Net worth 

Awards 
In 2002 Williams was awarded the Australian Sports Medal in recognition of creating a programme for troubled teens to learn to sail as part of their rehabilitation.

See also
Publishing and Broadcasting Limited
Crown Limited

References

Australian racehorse owners and breeders
Living people
People educated at Xavier College
Year of birth uncertain
1940 births